Martin Chilcott (born 12 December 1965) is a British entrepreneur specializing in environment and education, best known as the founder and CEO of 2degrees, the world’s largest community for sustainable business.

His first successful business venture was CTSS, a specialist technology marketing company, with colleague and friend James Tarin. In 1995, he established Clarity Communications, followed by various companies that included Meltwater Ventures, a green business incubation service.

Early life

Chilcott was born in Aldershot, Hampshire, the son of Rosemary and Lt-Col Michael John-Patrick Chilcott. Chilcott was educated at St Josephs College, Ipswich before going on to study History at Clare College, Cambridge.

Career 

In 1989, Chilcott started CTSS, a specialist technology marketing consultancy, with his current business partner, James Tarin. Their main client for 5 years was a small start-up business called The Carphone Warehouse, which would grow into Europe’s largest independent mobile phone retailer. As a result of its success, Chilcott’s business moved to London and in 1995 founded Clarity IBD Ltd, an e-business consultancy that would work with Abbey National and National Rail to create online content. This was later acquired by Proxicom, another e-business consultancy. After various further business ventures Chilcott co-founded Place Group, an educational consultancy company, in 2005. He would spend the next few years working alongside local authorities and national government programs until, by 2008, they were the market leader in delivering school-academy transitions in the UK.

A year after the founding of Place Group, Chilcott started a business incubator called Meltwater Ventures that specialized in environmental programs and resource scarcity. Meltwater Ventures would eventually generate the idea for 2degrees.

2degrees

By 2006, Chilcott had been drawn to sustainability and carbon reduction, having seen the opportunity build on a valuable business niche there. He, along with James Tarin, recognized that many business were attempting to solve similar sustainability problems independent of each other, but that and that there was no online community which could be used to connect them and collectively solve problems. This thinking led to the founding of the 2degrees Community in 2008 and, by 2011, it was the world largest Community for Sustainable Business and had offices in the UK and US.

Personal life 

Martin Chilcott currently lives in Oxford and currently spends his time between his family, his business, and maintaining his Dutch barge.

He is also a trustee of Oxford business x, a youth enterprise scheme based at the Said Business School in Oxford.

In 2011, he sat on the panel of judges for The Guardian's Sustainable Business Awards 2011.

References

External links 
 New Business interview with Martin Chilcott 
 2degrees Network 

British businesspeople
Living people
1965 births
People educated at St Joseph's College, Ipswich